The 2011 Women's U-19's European Handball Championship is the eighth edition of the continental handball event for this age group, and the fourth under its new name, that is being held between 4 and 14 August in the Netherlands. Norway entered the championship as title holders, after beaten 2009 hosts Hungary 29–27 in the previous tournament's final. According to the competition regulations, only players born on or after 1 January 1992 are eligible to participate.

Denmark won the championship for the third time, beating first time finalists Netherlands in the decisive match 29–27.

Venues

Five cities have been selected to stage the championship. In Almelo, Maastricht and Leek will only be held preliminary and main round matches. In Arnhem, where hosts Netherlands play their preliminary group, will also be held main round clashes and the placement matches 9–16. Rotterdam will be involved only in the final weekend to arrange the placement matches 5–8 as well as the semifinals, the bronze match and the final.

Qualification
A total of 29 national teams registered for the tournament, from which the four best placed teams of the 2009 Women's 17 European Handball Championship, namely Denmark, France, Norway and Russia automatically qualified for the championship, joined by organizer country Netherlands. The remaining twenty-four teams competed between 21–24 April 2011 in six groups of four for the eleven spots left. Groups 1 to 5 offered two places each, while from the sixth group only the winner advanced to the European Championship. After the mini-tournaments were concluded, the following teams qualified for the continental event: Spain, Serbia (Group 1); Germany, Austria (Group 2); Hungary, Sweden (Group 3); Croatia, Poland (Group 4); Ukraine, Slovenia (Group 5) and Romania (Group 6).

Draw
The draw for the groups of the final tournament took place in Leek, Netherlands, on 27 April 2011. In the process first the teams from pot 4, pot 3 and pot 1 were drawn, respectively, following that host nation Netherlands had the right to choose the group where they would like to be classified. The remaining three teams were distributed in the regular way.

Seedings

Preliminary round

Group A

All times are Central European Summer Time (UTC+2)

Group B

All times are Central European Summer Time (UTC+2)

Group C

All times are Central European Summer Time (UTC+2)

Group D

All times are Central European Summer Time (UTC+2)

Intermediate round

Group I1

All times are Central European Summer Time (UTC+2)

Group I2

All times are Central European Summer Time (UTC+2)

Main round

Group M1

All times are Central European Summer Time (UTC+2)

Group M2

All times are Central European Summer Time (UTC+2)

Placement round 13–16

Bracket

Cross matches

15th place final

13th place final

Placement round 9–12

Bracket

Cross matches

11th place final

9th place final

Placement round 5–8

Bracket

Cross matches

7th place final

5th place final

Final round

Bracket

Cross matches

Bronze medal match

Final

Rankings and awardees

Final ranking

All Star Team
Goalkeeper: 
Left Wing: 
Left Back: 
Playmaker: 
Pivot: 
Right Back: 
Right Wing:

Other awards
Top Scorer: 
Best Defence Player: 
Most Valuable Player: 

Source: eurohandball.com

References

External links
 
 Competition schedule

European Women's U-19 Handball Championship
2011 in handball
2011 in Dutch sport
International handball competitions hosted by the Netherlands
Women's handball in the Netherlands
19 European Handball Championship